Muireann Irish  is a cognitive neuropsychologist at the Brain and Mind Centre at the University of Sydney. She has a history of winning numerous International and National awards, including an Australian Research Council Future Fellowship and L’Oreal-UNESCO For Women in Science Fellowship. She has won, on average, at least one significant National or International prize per year, since 2013 (see 'Awards' below).

Career 
Irish works on the loss of empathy during dementia. She says she is "interested in how we remember the past and imagine the future. The relative frequency and ease with which we engage in those forms of thought belies their incredible complexity." Her career has explored how memory and imagination are changed during neurological conditions including Alzheimer’s disease. She has been awarded both Discovery Early Career Researcher and Future Fellow awards from the ARC. Irish's work on neuropsychology has been discussed on the ABC and her experiences of the L'Oreal Rising Talent award were described in Nature Jobs.

Irish has given science communication talks on the importance of day dreaming.

Diversity in science 
Irish has advocated for diversity in science on many platforms, and she "is committed to the promotion and retention of women in science". She was named as one of the inaugural 30 ‘Superstars of STEM’, part of a growing movement with the goal of providing positive role models to young girls and minorities to pursue a career in science. Irish is one of a growing number of academic women in STEMM who are committed to retaining women in science.

Select publications

Awards 
Irish has received a number of international awards. 
 2020 – The Gottschalk Medal is awarded by the Australian Academy of Science 
 2019 – Young Investigator Award, from the Cognitive Neuroscience Agency 
 2019 – British Neuropsychological Society – Elizabeth Warrington Prize.
 2017 – L’Oréal–UNESCO International Rising Talent Award.
 2017 – Superstars of STEMM.
 2016–2020 – ARC Future Fellow.
 2016 – NSW Premier's Prize – Early Career Researcher of the Year
 2015 – L’Oreal–UNESCO For Women in Science Fellowship.
 2014 – NSW Young Tall Poppy Science Award.
 2013 – Laird Cermak Award for Outstanding Research in Memory presented by the International Neuropsychological Society.

Irish is a Fellow of the Royal Society of New South Wales (FRSN).

Media 

 Irish's work has been described on The Conversation.
 Her work provided insight into why time flies as one gets older and why we day dream.
 The ABC described the neuroscience work conducted by her and her team.
 Dementia Australia described her work on dementia.
 Her career path and passion for inspiring others was described in Careers with STEM.

References 

Living people
Year of birth missing (living people)
Australian women neuroscientists
Academic staff of the University of Sydney
Neurophysiologists
Fellows of the Royal Society of New South Wales